José Freddy Fernández Beita (born February 25, 1974) is a Costa Rican footballer who played as defender.

Club career
Born in Pérez Zeledón, Fernández began playing club football with Municipal Pérez Zeledón at 20 years of age. After spending most of his career with his hometown club, he joined Águilas Guanacastecas in May 2009 but left them after a brief spell and finished his career with Santos de Guápiles.

International career
Fernández made several appearances for the Costa Rica national football team, captaining the side during the 2010 FIFA World Cup qualification rounds. He made his international debut in the 2007 UNCAF Nations Cup. Fernández also participated in the 2007 and 2009 CONCACAF Gold Cup finals.

His final international was an August 2009 FIFA World Cup qualification match against Honduras.

Honours
 CONCACAF Gold Cup All-Tournament Team: 2009

Personal
His parents are Aricelda Beita and Ezequías Fernández.

Fernández is the brother of former Costa Rica international footballer, Pastor Fernández.

References

External links
 

1974 births
Living people
Association football defenders
Costa Rican footballers
Costa Rica international footballers
2007 UNCAF Nations Cup players
2007 CONCACAF Gold Cup players
2009 UNCAF Nations Cup players
2009 CONCACAF Gold Cup players
Municipal Pérez Zeledón footballers
Municipal Liberia footballers
Santos de Guápiles footballers
Copa Centroamericana-winning players